León Dujovne (15 November 1898 – 16 January 1984) was an Argentine writer, philosopher, essayist and journalist.

Early life 
Dujovne was born to Jewish parents in the village of Kurilovich, near the small town of Mohyliv-Podilskyi (Vinnytsia Oblast), on the border with Bessarabia (Moldova) in the Russian Empire. At the age of one, his parents emigrated to Argentina; the family settled in Basavilbaso, Entre Ríos, one of the several Jewish colonies founded by Baron Maurice de Hirsch in the province.

Notable works 
  El judaísmo como cultura. Buenos Aires: Ediciones Nueva Presencia, 1980.

References 

1898 births
1984 deaths
Argentine essayists
Argentine Jews
Argentine journalists
Male journalists
Argentine people of Ukrainian-Jewish descent
Emigrants from the Russian Empire to Argentina
Jews from the Russian Empire
Naturalized citizens of Argentina
Jewish Argentine writers
Jewish philosophers
People from Entre Ríos Province
20th-century essayists
20th-century  Argentine philosophers